Bajrabarahi is a village development committee in Makwanpur District in the Narayani Zone of southern Nepal.  it had a population of 8821. 

Bajrabarahi is named after the Goddess Bajrabarahi (Devi). There is an ancient and old temple of Goddess Bajrabarahi and the locals celebrate a massive Jatra / festival on Baishakh purnima in every 3 years.

Bajrabarahi is historically important because of historical Gopali village (Kunchhal), manuscript of King Amshubarma etc.

It is also known as Tistung, Bajrabarahi because the name "Tistung" is popular and wide known to many from the time when Nepal's first highway - Tribhuwan Highway connecting Nepal to India, came into use. 

Bajrabarahi is famous for its off season vegetable that are sold in major markets all over the country. Bajrabarahi exports its agricultural products to Kathmandu, Hetauda, Pokhara, Narayanghat, Butwal, Birjung and Bhaktapur and to India as well. 

According to One Village One Product program of the government of Nepal, Bajrabarahi is leading and setting an example for Kiwifruit farming in Makwanpur district. Bajrabarahi exports around 4500 tons of potatoes, 3600 tons of cauliflowers, and 12 tons of kiwifruit annually.

Bajrabarahi lately is being developed as a worthy travel and tourism destination. Specially because it is located ideally and gives easy and fast access to other major tourist destinations here like - Daman, Chitlang, Kulekhani etc.; the place is being visited by thousands of domestic as well as international tourists. 

Tourism infrastructures are being developed slowly. The highway from Kathmandu/Hetauda to Bajrabarahi is black topped and well maintained and there is a full-fledged resort called Om Adhyay Retreat, with the facilities of lodging, varieties of fooding options, entertainment and refreshment activities like, boating in Kulekhani, hiking, jungle safari, village tour, sightseeing, agro-activities etc., opened and operated by the locals.

References

Populated places in Lalitpur District, Nepal
Nepal municipalities established in 2015